Philippe Dehouck (born 2 August 1966) is a French former professional football player and manager.

Playing career 
Dehouck was born in Lille, but began his professional career in the city of Thonon-les-Bains. He played two seasons in the Division 2 with Thonon before joining Paris Saint-Germain in 1987.

On 27 February 1988, Dehouck made his debut for PSG in a 0–0 draw against Bordeaux. He played his final match for the club on 30 April 1988, a 4–0 loss to Nice. For the following two seasons, Dehouck was loaned out to Annecy in the Division 2; he played a total of 58 games for the club.

Career statistics

References 

Living people
1966 births
Footballers from Lille
French footballers
Association football midfielders
Paris Saint-Germain F.C. players
SO Châtellerault players
FC Annecy players
Ligue 1 players
Ligue 2 players
French Division 3 (1971–1993) players
French football managers
Championnat National players